Silent Running is a 1972 science fiction film.

Silent Running may also refer to:

Music
 Silent Running (band), a Northern Irish rock band
 Silent Running (album), a 2011 album by 65daysofstatic, an alternate soundtrack for the 1972 film
 "Silent Running (On Dangerous Ground)", a 1985 song by Mike + The Mechanics
 "Silent Running", a song by Carbon Based Lifeforms from Hydroponic Garden
 "Silent Running", a song by Gorillaz featuring Adeleye Omotayo from Cracker Island
 "Silent Running", a song by the Korgis from Dumb Waiters
 "Silent Running", a song by Orchestral Manoeuvres in the Dark from Dazzle Ships
 "Silent Running", a song by Sandra Cretu from The Wheel of Time
 "Silent Running", a track by Klaus Schulze from Trancefer, inspired by the 1972 film

Military navy
 Silent running (submarine), a stealth mode of operation for submarines
 Silent Running: My Years on a World War II Attack Submarine, a memoir by U.S. Vice Admiral James F. Calvert

See also
 Run Silent, Run Deep (disambiguation)